José Albano Cid de Ferreira Tavares (born 4 February 1942) is a Portuguese singer, composer and record producer. Internationally, Cid is best known for his 1978 progressive rock album 10,000 Anos Depois Entre Vénus e Marte and for representing Portugal at the Eurovision Song Contest 1980 with the song "Um grande, grande amor".

With a career spanning more than 60 years, Cid has been awarded 25 Silver, eight Gold and three Platinum records in Portugal. In 2019, Cid received a Latin Grammy Lifetime Achievement Award, becoming the second Portuguese singer, after Carlos do Carmo, to receive the honour.

Early life
Cid was born in 1942 in Chamusca, son of Francisco Albano Coutinho Ferreira and Fernanda Tavares Salter Cid Ferreira Gameiro. At age 6, he moved with his family to the municipality of Anadia. His professional career began when he started a covers band called Os Babies ("The Babies"), in 1956. 

In 1960, Cid began Law School at the University of Coimbra (FDUC). During his time in Coimbra, he created the musical group Conjunto Orfeão with José Niza, Proença de Carvalho and Rui Ressurreição. Cid subsequently joined the bands Trio Los Dos and Os Claves.

In 1965, Cid dropped out of school, without having completed his first year, and left for Lisbon to attend the National Institute of Physical Education (INEF). One of his colleagues at INEF was the brother of Michel, a member of the band Conjunto Mistério. After an audition, he was invited to join the group, later renamed Quarteto 1111. 

Cid did not graduate from INEF either, because he was called to serve as an officer in the Portuguese Air Force. At the air base of Ota, he was a gym teacher from 1968 to 1972. His days were spent teaching in the mornings, and rehearsing during the afternoons, playing music in a garage. On the weekends, he performed with Quarteto 1111.

Quarteto 1111

José Cid co-founded Quarteto 1111, the first band to take a new approach to pop-rock music in Portugal, with a modern line-up and instrumentation.

Quarteto 1111 was the first symphonic rock band in Portugal. Between 1968-69 they received media attention from a hit single, "El Rei D. Sebastião", a song about the loss of the Portuguese king D. Sebastião, who supposedly died in the fields of Morocco during the battle of Alcazarquivir (a loss that would eventually lead to Portugal losing its independence from Spain). All the myths related with the return of King Sebastian – a quite anchored Portuguese myth – were fairly treated in this song. The harpsichord made its first appearance in Portuguese rock music. A single with the English version of the song was released in Great Britain. José Cid was the band leader, composer, keyboard and lead singer. The rest of the band had a classic formation influenced by the usual Beatles line-up, but with a sound and song structure reminiscent of The Moody Blues. The following album continued in the same vein, combining melodic songs with new "progressive" instruments, namely the Mellotron. Later on the band evolved to the late 1970s pop sound.

Progressive rock

Cid explored symphonic rock with Cantamos Pessoas Vivas (1974), Vida – Sons do Quotidiano (1976) and 10,000 Anos Depois Entre Venus E Marte (1978). Most of the songs, influenced by a sort of mix combining The Moody Blues and Pink Floyd psychedelia, were composed by Cid, some of them with the help of guitar player Mike Sergeant and drummer Ramon Galarza. Another (unfinished) project from this lineup, Vozes do Além, explored the "Life after Death / Reincarnation" theme. Featured in the record are a poem by Natália Correia ("Creio") and two from Sophia de Mello Breyner Andresen ("Quando" and "Um Dia"). Presently, work on this album has resumed, with the original lineup and the addition of younger musicians.

OTI Festival 
In 1979 José Cid was selected by RTP to represent Portugal in the eighth edition of the OTI Festival, which was held in Caracas, Venezuela. He competed with the song "Na cabana junto à praia" (In a little house next to the beach), which was well received in the festival to the point that he managed to get the third place with 32 points.

In 1981, one year after his participation in the Eurovision Song Contest, he was again selected by the Portuguese broadcaster to compete in the tenth edition of the OTI Festival, which was held in Mexico City. This time he was not as successful as in his previous attempt in the Latin-American song contest and he got the tenth place scoring 14 points.

Eurovision
The pop inclinations of José Cid led him to create, during the first half of the 1970s, a 4 piece vocal pop group (Green Windows) and to participate in the 1974 Festival da Canção with Imagens and No Dia Em Que O Rei Fez Anos.  He also participated in the Eurovision Song Contest 1980 with the song Um grande, grande amor.

Present day
José Cid himself made a career as a songwriter and singer, and remains a popular and active musician in Portugal.

His latest album "Menino Prodígio", released in 2015, was awarded the Pedro Osório Award for the best album of the year by the Sociedade Portuguesa de Autores (SPA) (English: Portuguese Society of Authors). 

In 2016, Cid released his first album in Spain. He received a Latin Grammy Lifetime Achievement Award in 2019.

Personal life 
José Cid married Gabriela Carrascalão in 2013. Carrascalão is an East Timorese journalist and artist/painter. Cid and Gabriela live in a farm in Mogofores, municipality of Anadia. 

José Cid has one daughter, Ana Sofia Infante Pedroso (born 1964) from his first marriage with Emilia Infante Pedroso. Ana Sofia worked briefly with her father, but they are currently estranged.

Discography

With Quarteto 1111

with Green Windows

Solo work

See also
Quarteto 1111
10,000 Anos Depois Entre Venus E Marte
Green Windows
Progressive rock
Portuguese rock
Sonho Desfeito (1987 Jorge Ferreira's album on which Cid has worked)

References

External links
 José Cid Discography

1942 births
Living people
People from Santarém District
Eurovision Song Contest entrants of 1980
Eurovision Song Contest entrants of 1998
Eurovision Song Contest entrants for Portugal
20th-century Portuguese male singers
Portuguese songwriters
Male songwriters
Latin Grammy Lifetime Achievement Award winners
Golden Globes (Portugal) winners